3′,5′-cyclic-AMP phosphodiesterase (EC 3.1.4.53, cAMP-specific phosphodiesterase, cAMP-specific PDE, PDE1, PDE2A, PDE2B, PDE4, PDE7, PDE8, PDEB1, PDEB2) is an enzyme with systematic name 3′,5′-cyclic-AMP 5′-nucleotidohydrolase. It catalyses the following reaction

 adenosine 3′,5′-cyclic phosphate + H2O  AMP

This enzyme requires Mg2+ or Mn2+ for activity.

References

External links 
 

EC 3.1.4